Started in 2015, as a virtual reality Meetup Group in Toronto, VRTO launched the VRTO Virtual & Augmented Reality World Conference & Expo in June 2016 – an international exhibition and professional conference exploring arts, culture and science through immersive technologies. Its inaugural year – held at the Mattamy Centre (better known as Maple Leaf Gardens in Toronto, Canada) – featured keynotes from University of Toronto Professor Steve Mann, Hollywood film director Brett Leonard – director of The Lawnmower Man, Chief Digital Officer Ana Serrano of the Canadian Film Centre and Phil Lelyveld of USC.

Founded, produced and programmed by futurist, cinematographer, composer and Hollywood actor Keram Malicki-Sanchez, the opening year featured a keynote, town hall and discussion panel around creating a Code of Ethics for Humanistic Augmentation VRTO Spearheads Code of Ethics on Human Augmentation also known as the HACode or The Toronto Code. In 2016 and 2017 the show was co-produced by Jessy Blaze and Chrissy Aitchison and in 2018 and 2019 by Stephanie Greenall, Aitchison and Melanie Smith. Longtime collaborator Joshua Miles Joudrie served as a key production consultant.

VRTO 2016 
The conference, in its inaugural year welcomed 800 attendees and 64 speakers from Toronto, Montreal and Los Angeles, and featured over 20 companies working in the development of virtual reality, augmented reality and mixed reality in addition to training sessions dedicated to the creation of 360 video, game development, photogrammetry and WebVR. The conference featured a preview of the FIVARS Festival of International Virtual & Augmented Reality Stories.

The conference featured a workshop titled The Hacker's Guide to the Metaverse that taught programming WebVR using the JanusVR open source platform.

VRTO 2017 
The largest conference dedicated on virtual and augmented reality in Canada, the sophomore year featured 100 speakers and 60 installations. The second year of the VRTO Conference & Expo in 2017 was staged at the Rogers Communications Centre on the Ryerson University campus in downtown Toronto June 24–26 with the theme of "Giants" based on the quote by Sir Isaac Newton: "“If I have seen further than others, it is by standing upon the shoulders of Giants.”

Keynote speakers included Stanford neuroscientist Professor Walter Greenleaf, PhD, Graham Smith, David A. Smith, Dr. Sara Diamond - President of OCAD University, Moses Znaimer, Charlie Fink, Dr. Karan Singh and James McCrae - founders of JanusVR and additional live interviews with Steve Mann, and Tim Merel among others.

Several panels, under the banner of "Super Sessions" featured leaders in the field of Virtual & Augmented Reality, health sciences (Dr. Lora Appel, Dr. Tom Overly, Dr. Stephane Bouchard), "Out-of-Home" entertainment (James Jensen of THE VOID, Eyal Kleiner of IMAX, Ed Callway of AMD).

The show was also the launchpad for various products and initiatives including the Canadian Film Centre's Pulse on VR "living ecosystem" report on the Virtual Reality industry, the Webmoti camera that mitigates social anxiety for children with autism who wish to participate in the classroom, and the Somato Cherry haptic wireless virtual reality controller.

Themed pavilions were co-curated between Malicki-Sanchez and specialists in their respective fields, including Dr. Maria Karam (somatosensory pavilion), Ian Kelso (augmented reality conference track), Isaac Rayment (augmented reality "ARt Gallery") that featured early augmented reality artists Zenka, Daniel Leighton, Alex Mayhew, Dan Goldman, among others.

VRTO 2018 
VRTO 2018 shifted its lens to psychedelia, esoterica, philosophy and phenomenology and how they relate to experiential design, blockchain and Visual Effects featuring such speakers as Steve "Spaz" Williams (the VFX wizard behind the films The Mask, The Abyss and Jurassic Park), Philip Rosedale creator of Linden Labs and Second Life, and Brett Leonard, alongside 85 other leaders of the VR industry. In its third year, the event added an extra day of conferences, workshops and training. The exhibits featured numerous startup companies in the ideaboost incubator in partnership with the Canadian Film Centre.

VRTO 2019 
In this year the conference moved to a new location – the Toronto Media Arts Centre. The 2019 conference shifted focus onto a recalibration for the spatialized technologies industry as a whole and added various notable authors to the lineup, including bestselling author Blake Harris "The History of the Future", and Douglas Rushkoff "Team Human". Other notable speakers included Sarah Vicks from Intel Studios and Olivier Asselin from Ubisoft who spoke about volumetric video and VR locomotion, respectively, and Amelia Winger-Bearskin, YouTube phenom syrmor made an in-person appearance, and panels on e-Sports, inclusivity, and a live game show featuring Blair Renaud, and Andre Elijah about game development.

VRTO 2020 
With the social and global effects of the COVID-19 pandemic many conferences were forced to adapt or close down. The VRTO conference moved online for its 5th anniversary, forming a multiplatform, multimodal experience founder Malicki-Sanchez termed "The Flotilla," that had a 30-day run spanning June 6 to July 6. It used a video-streaming conference app, the Mozilla Hubs web VR platform running custom code on the Amazon Web Services cloud, the Discord\platform, and hosted a microsummit on accessibility. The conference also featured contributions from JanusVR and Rochester Institute of Technology. Podcaster Kent Bye wrote a phenomenological journal of his experience and stated that "VRToronto is doing a lot of pioneering work in making their conference more accessible.". The show was co-produced by Stephanie Greenall.

VRTO 2021 
For the second year in a row, and due to the ongoing global COVID-19 pandemic VRTO was hosted wholly in WebXR. "The Flotilla" continued to be a junction to link various virtual world platforms together. In the 2021 event this included links to various virtual world platforms along with the Dyscorpia Project spearheaded by international media artist Marilene Oliver and her fellows at the University of Alberta.

Besides these virtual spaces the conference hosted an extensive seven-day lineup of panels and presentations that included developer talks around game development, virtual production, Esports, accessibility and inclusion, volumetric capture, the arts, medical applications, enterprise and data analysis, and featured a daily live talkshow hosted from within the virtual world by host Max Noir. The event also featured a live performance workshop that was streamed to attendees and culminated in a live virtual performance operated by Dasha Kitteredge and Ari Tarr that was also viewable via VR, on mobile and desktop devices. The show was reviewed positively in VRTrend magazine.

VRTO 2022 
VRTO returned to being a live and in-person event in 2022, taking place at OCAD University. The event was produced by Keram Malicki-Sanchez and associate producer Aimee Reynolds. The marketing campaign featured muppets created using GAN-created images with the Midjourney AI platform. Its new tagline was "Where Fresh Ideas Are Born." The 2-day conference featured speakers including Dr. Alexis Morris, Dario Laverde HTC Vive, Justin Cathcart (Dark Slope) and the lead team of virtual production from VFX studio Pixomondo who shared secrets behind the creation of Star Trek: Strange New Worlds and Star Trek: Discovery. The show focused on the way spatial media was reaching critical mass in affecting media creation and featuring talks about live VR theater performance, Hyperreality TV, natural-language Holodecks, and next-gen haptic technology. The event drew over 200 attendees from across North America.

References

Virtual reality organizations
Technology conferences
Video game conferences
Business conferences
June 2019 events in Canada